Henry Jindrich Strasak (January 8, 1901 – May 16, 1985) was an American Federal Bureau of Investigation (FBI) and Central Intelligence Agency (CIA) officer.

Early life

Henry Strasak was born in Rock Island, Illinois. He was a son of immigrants from the former Austria-Hungary of Czech and Austrian descent. After graduating from university, where he studied music and linguistics, he joined the United States Department of State. Strasak was stationed in Argentina and Chile and rose quickly in rank.  However, in the mid-1930s, he was recruited by J. Edgar Hoover and joined the Federal Bureau of Investigation. His main responsibility was to gather intelligence on Fascist and Nazi sympathizers in the U.S. as well as to identify these networks abroad. Later Strasak was sent to occupied Europe where he worked closely with the Office of Strategic Services (the precursor to the CIA), which had helped to organize guerrilla fighting, sabotage and espionage during World War II. He gathered intelligence on German activities and plans in Austria and Protectorate Bohemia and Moravia, reporting directly to Allen Dulles, an OSS station chief in Bern, Switzerland.

CIA career

After the war in Europe, Strasak resigned from the FBI and joined the War Department as an intelligence officer, working under Brigadier General John Magruder. Later he worked with the Central Intelligence Group (CIG) and together with Jackson, Correa and Souers, Strasak helped to lay the foundation for establishment of the CIA. Henry Strasak remained with the CIA for rest of his life, working in the Directorate for Plans and acting as an advisor to several CIA directors, including Dulles, McCone and Helms. However, very little is known about his career in the CIA and his later life. It is believed that Henry Strasak died on May 16, 1985.

Notes
 In 1939, Strasak married Francis (Franziska) Winkler with whom he had two daughters.
 Strasak spoke fluently English, German, Czech, Russian, Spanish, Portuguese, Italian, Slovak and Polish.

References
 Richard M. Bissell Jr., with Jonathan E. Lewis and Frances T. Pudlo.  Reflections of a Cold Warrior: From Yalta to the Bay of Pigs (New Haven and London:  Yale University Press, 1996).  
 Phil Taubman. Secret Empire: Eisenhower, the CIA, and the Hidden Story of America’s Space Espionage (New York, NY: Simon & Schuster, 2003). 

1901 births
1985 deaths
American spies
People of the Central Intelligence Agency
People of the Office of Strategic Services
American people of Austrian descent
American people of Czech descent